Old Ford Island is a nature reserve managed by the London Wildlife Trust in the London Borough of Newham.

This site has woodland, meadow, tall herbs and scrub. It has a variety of breeding birds and is important for butterflies, including the small heath, small copper, wall and common blue.

The site is private land with no public access.

References

London Wildlife Trust